Wilson Gunaratne (born March 9, 1949, as විල්සන් ගුණරත්න [Sinhala]) is an actor and comedian in Sri Lankan cinema, stage drama and television. He is most notable for the role Kodithuwakku in television comedy sitcom Nonavaruni Mahathvaruni and stage drama Charitha Atak. It is the only stage play in Sri Lanka in which one actor portrays eight different characters with eight different voices.

Acting career
At that time when he was working in an executive position in the field of hotel management, Gunaratne met Tony Ranasinghe through his elder brother. Under his guidance, Gunaratne made a minor role in a scene shot in the hotel premises for a film. Then Tony nominated Gunaratne for the role of the 'Duke' in Shakespeare's translation stage play Veniciye Welenda directed by playwright Bandula Vithanage. The play made the turning point of his acting career. Later he performed in two of Vithanage's plays: Sakala Jana, Muhuṇu Dekak. Meanwhile, he did a scientific study of comedy at IFT, an affiliate of the University of Noida, New Delhi.

He was introduced to teledrama under the guidance of former parliamentary translator and actor Alfred Perera. Alfred has worked in China and the Philippines Radio. He invited Gunaratne to the orchestra for the popular television serial Vinoda Samaya program aired by the Sri Lanka Broadcasting Corporation. He was the drummer of that program. His maiden cinema acting came through film Samuganimi Ma Samiyani directed by his elder brother. Then he got a chance to play in his brother's second directed film Sasaraka Pethuma.

Gunaratne was highly popularized with the television sitcom Nonavaruni Mahathvaruni through the character Kodithuwakku. In the meantime, he acted in the serial Sathpura Wasiyo with the role "Pappa" which made his hallmark in drama career. Apart from that, he produced a political comedy stage drama titled Charitha Hathak, which was later updated into Charitha Atak. Since its opening, Charitha Hathak has completed 37 shows within eight months. His seven characters include, Kodituwakku from "Nonava-runi Mahatvaruni", Pappa, Prof. Pragnaratne, Transport Teacher Mr. Bastian, Prof. Marenzie (Italian).

In 1998, he made first directorial debut with the television political satire Kodivinaya telecast by ITN.

Selected stage dramas
 Charitha Hathak
 Charitha Atak

Selected television serials
 Bhavana - Amuttha
 Charitha Dekak
 Hathara Wate
 Kinihiraka Pipi Mal 
 Kodivinaya
 Kiyadenna Adare Tharam
 Kula Kumariya 
 Kulavilokanaya
 Nonavaruni Mahathvaruni
 Kathura
 Sadisi Tharanaya 
 Vinivindimi
 Willy King Show
 Yes Madam

Filmography
 No. denotes the Number of Sri Lankan film in the Sri Lankan cinema.

References

External links
 Wilson Gunaratne's Charitha Atak
 Charitha Atak for a stress free evening
 චරිත අටක් මවන එකම චරිතය

Sri Lankan male film actors
Sinhalese male actors
Living people
1949 births